Theodor Bull (1870 – 1958) was a Norwegian businessperson and genealogist.

He was born in Kristiania as a son of medical doctor Edvard Isak Hambro Bull (1845–1925). He was a brother of theatre director Johan Peter Bull, historian and politician Edvard Bull and literary professor Francis Bull. Through Edvard Bull he was the uncle of historian Edvard Bull. He was also a nephew of military officer Karl Sigwald Johannes Bull, grandnephew of Anders Sandøe Ørsted Bull, great-grandson of Georg Jacob Bull and great-great-grandson of Chief Justice Johan Randulf Bull.

In his professional career he worked as a wholesaler. He also published several genealogical works, and was the chairman of the Norwegian Genealogical Society from 1943 to 1952. In 1952 he was created an honorary member.

References

1870 births
1958 deaths
Writers from Oslo
Norwegian businesspeople
Norwegian genealogists